The Ford Duratorq engine, commonly referred to as Duratorq, is the marketing name of a range of Ford diesel engines first introduced in 2000 for the Ford Mondeo range of cars. The larger capacity 5-cylinder units use the Power Stroke branding when installed in North American-market vehicles.

The first design, codenamed "Puma" during its development, replaced the older Endura-D unit which had been around since 1984. Commercial versions of the Puma unit replaced Ford's older "2.5Di" type unit used in the Transit, and many other manufacturers' vehicles - most notably the London Taxi and in the Land Rover Defender.

Other unrelated units in this range have been developed by Ford and PSA. The TDCi Duratorq engines are available in vehicles from Ford, Jaguar, Land Rover, Volvo and Mazda.

A new EcoBlue diesel engine range, originally codenamed "Panther" and planned to be available in 2.0- and 1.5-litre variants, will progressively replace the Duratorq engines from 2016.

Engine reference

DLD

The inline-four engines are sold under the Duratorq TDCi name by Ford, and as the HDi by Citroën and Peugeot. These are part of the DLD family. Mazda also uses the DLD engine in the Mazda2 and the Mazda3, calling it the MZ-CD or CiTD. The Ford/PSA joint-venture for the production of the DLD was announced in September, 1998.

Officially, there are two families of engines in the range:
 The 1.4L is generally non-intercooled
 The 1.5L derived from the 1.6L
 The 1.6 L always intercooled

Ford later added their unrelated 1.8 L DLD-418 engine to the DLD family, though it is properly part of the Ford Endura engine family.

1.4 "Tiger" 
The Duratorq DLD-414 (or DV4) is a  inline-four Turbo–Diesel. This engine was developed in Trémery by Peugeot, as described in the joint-venture agreement with Ford. This engine is built in France, UK and India.

The DV4 is available in two versions:
 One, an 8-valve design, uses a BorgWarner KP35 turbocharger, but no intercooler. This is the same turbocharger as the Renault K9K Diesel. It is Euro III compliant, but received a diesel particulate filter in 2006 to make it Euro IV compliant.
 A second version uses a DOHC 16-valve design, with an intercooled variable-geometry turbocharger. This derivation will no longer be built from 2006, as it will not be able to comply with the Euro IV regulations. It also uses Delphi Automotive's DCR1400 common-rail injection system.

1.5
In 2012, Ford added the 1.5-litre, closely derived from the 1.6-litre engine. Bore was reduced from 75 to 73.5 mm while the stroke remained unchanged 88.3 mm.

1.6 "Tiger" 
The DLD-416 (or DV6) is a   version also used by Ford, Mazda, Volvo, Mini, Peugeot and Citroën. This particular engine was designed by Peugeot engineers on behalf of PSA and Ford.

1.8 "Lynx" 
The Duratorq DLD-418 is a  intercooled common rail diesel engine. It is completely unrelated to the 1.4/1.6 units, and is a development of Ford's 1.8 8v Endura-D engine that saw service through the 1980s and 1990s. However, Ford considers it part of the DLD family, as evidenced by the official "DLD" name.

The Endura-D was heavily revised and updated with a variable-vane turbocharger and a Delphi high-pressure common rail injection system and relaunched in 2001 as the 'DuraTorq TDCi', with the original engine being rebadged 'DuraTorq TDDi'.

This engine, possibly known within Ford as "Kent Diesel", is the last evolution of the 997 cc petrol engine introduced in the 105E Anglia in 1959.

ZSD ("Puma")

Codenamed Puma during development, these Ford 2.0 L, 2.2 L, and 2.4 L engines are called ZSD. They are produced at the company's Dagenham plant in east London.

Note: the 2.5 and 3.0L "W" engines in above table are NOT Puma engines. They are Mazda designed commercial Diesel engines with no commonality to Puma. The "W" engine family is used in the Asia Pacific Ranger and Everest models currently running out.

2.0

Released in 2000, to coincide with the launch of the Mk3 Ford Mondeo, the Duratorq  ZSD-420 was initially available as a  direct injection turbodiesel. Producing  and  it was a vast improvement over the 1.8 Endura-D powering the Mk2 Mondeo. It featured a 16-valve cylinder head with twin chain driven camshafts and utilised a variable-geometry turbocharger with overboost function.

In late 2001 the engine was fitted with Delphi common rail fuel injection and called the Duratorq TDCi (Turbo Diesel Commonrail injection), with the original unit being renamed the Duratorq TDDi (Turbo Diesel Direct injection). In 2002 the Duratorq TDDi was replaced by a detuned version of the Duratorq TDCi.

With 2005 came another detuned version of the TDCi for the Mondeo.

Applications:
Ford Transit 2.0 TDDi & TDCi 75, 85, 100 PS(TDDi) 125 (TDCi) (/) (/) (/) (/)
 2000–2002 Ford Mondeo 2.0 TD & TDDi,  and 
 2001–2007 Ford Mondeo 2.0 TDCi 130,  and 
 2002–2007 Ford Mondeo 2.0 TDCi 115,  and 
 2005–2007 Ford Mondeo 2.0 TDCi 90,  and 
 2003–2009 Jaguar X-Type 2.0d,  and    DSWDD

2.2

In 2004, Ford introduced the Duratorq ZSD-422, a  turbodiesel for top-of-the-range versions of the Mondeo and Jaguar X-Type which produced . This is unrelated to the PSA DW12 2.2 unit used in Peugeot and Citroën applications.

Applications:
 Ford Transit
 2004–2007 Ford Mondeo 2.2 TDCi 155,  and 
 2004–2009 Jaguar X-Type
 2011–2016 Land Rover Defender
 2011–2021 Ford Ranger T6 & Mazda BT-50 2.2 TDCi / MZ-CD 2.2  & 
2012– 2016 Ford Transit Custom
 2015–2021 Ford Everest 2.2 TDCi
2007-2016 Peugeot Boxer/Citroën Relay

2.4
The  Duratorq ZSD-424 is a turbocharged and intercooled Diesel.

Applications:
 Ford Transit
 2002-2006 LDV Convoy
 2002 London Taxi TXII
 2007-2011 Land Rover Defender

2.5 (Mazda WLC)
Introduced for the Thailand-built 2007 Ford Ranger (J97U) is a 2.5 L diesel engine. This truck is a clone of the Mazda B-Series and thus the engine is a Mazda engine. The engine has no commonality to Ford's "Puma" engine or VM Motori. It is a development of the IDI Mazda 2.2L normally aspirated, later 2.5L NA and Turbo and later 2.9L NA, with Bosch common-rail direct injection and a variable geometry turbocharger. The WLC engine code is a Mazda engine code, not being changed for use in the Mazda B-Series clone Ford Ranger. It produces  @ 3500 rpm and  @ 1800 rpm.

3.0 (Mazda WEC)
A 3.0L Mazda W-engine similar to the 2.5 is also used in the 2007 Ranger as the top of the range. It produces  @ 3200 rpm and  @ 1800 rpm.

The W-engine family remains a Mazda engine and has no commonality to "Puma"

3.2
The 3.2 is a straight 5 cyl engine used in the Ford Transit, the Ford Ranger(2012-2022), Ford Everest(2015-2022), Mazda BT-50, Troller T4 and the Vivarail D-Train. For the North American-spec Transit, the 3.2L Duratorq is modified to meet American and Canadian emissions standards and is branded as a Power Stroke engine.
and Version Asia&Europe DuratorqTDCi is rated @3000 rpm and @1750 - 2500 rpm.

2005 TDCi (PSA DW Based)

Continuing the Ford/PSA diesel engine joint-venture, these straight-four engines are sold under the Duratorq TDCi name by Ford, and as the HDi by Citroën and Peugeot. A development of the existing DW10/DW12 engine, the new engines have a traditional belt-driven system, moving away from the chain-driven camshafts of the previous generation (Puma) TDCi engines. Both engines utilise common rail diesel technology and are the result of the fourth phase of the cooperation between PSA and Ford (initiated in 1998).

Both engines utilise all-new, third-generation common rail injection systems. The 2.0 engines utilising a system from Siemens and the 2.2 a system from Bosch. This higher injection pressure, associated with new piezo-electric injectors in which each nozzle is equipped with seven apertures (instead of five previously), allows the number of injections to be multiplied (potentially up to six per cycle) and ensures meticulous uniformity of the diesel injection spray pattern. As a result of this optimised air/diesel mix, combustion is more complete and more uniform, and therefore reduces emissions at source.

2.0 (PSA DW10 Based)

Production is currently taking place in France and Skövde in Sweden. The engine was released to Ford models in 2005 Ford Focus, and followed in the 2007 Mk IV Mondeo. It features a 16-valve cylinder head with twin belt driven camshafts (exhaust camshaft connected to cambelt with inlet camshaft indirectly linked via a timing chain) and utilises a variable geometry turbocharger with overboost function. An intercooler is always present, as opposed to some applications of its predecessor.

Applications:
 2003–present Ford Focus C-Max 2.0 TDCi,  and 
 2005–present Ford Focus 2.0 TDCi,  and 
 2006–present Ford S-Max 2.0 TDCi,  and 
 2006–present Ford S-Max 2.0 TDCi,  and 
 2006–present Ford Galaxy 2.0 TDCi,  and 
 2006–present Ford Galaxy 2.0 TDCi,  and 
 2015–present Ford Galaxy 2.0 TDCi,  and 
 2007–2014 Ford Mondeo 2.0 TDCi,  and 
 2007–2010 Ford Mondeo 2.0 TDCi,  and 
 2008–present Ford Kuga 2.0 TDCi,  and 
 2008–2013 Ford Kuga 2.0 TDCi,  and 
 2010–2014 Ford Mondeo 2.0 TDCi,  and 
 2014–2018 Ford Mondeo 2.0 TDCi,  and 
 2014–2018 Ford Mondeo 2.0 TDCi,  and 
 2015–2018 Ford Mondeo 2.0 TDCi,  and 

Other Applications:
 2004–2007 Peugeot 307 2.0 HDi,  and 
 2005–present Peugeot 407 2.0 HDi,  and 
 2005–present Peugeot 607 2.0 HDi,  and 
 2006–present Peugeot 807 2.0 HDi,  and 
 2008–present Peugeot 308 2.0 HDi,  and 
 2011–present Peugeot 508 2.0 HDi,  and 

2.2 (PSA DW12 Based)

It has been engineered by Ford in England, as described in the fourth phase of the joint-venture agreement with PSA. Production takes place in PSA's Tremery plant. It features a 16-valve cylinder head with twin belt driven camshafts and utilises a variable geometry turbocharger with overboost function, rather than the twin turbo approach of Peugeot and Citroën. Land Rover used this engine in the Freelander 2 and Range Rover Evoque.

Applications:
 2008–2010 Ford Mondeo 2.2 TDCi,  and 
 2008–2015 Ford S-Max 2.2 TDCi,  and 
 2008–2015 Ford Galaxy 2.2 TDCi,  and 
Other applications:
 2011–2015 Range Rover Evoque 2.2 eD4,  and 
 2011–2015 Range Rover Evoque 2.2 SD4,  and 
 2014–2015 Land Rover Discovery Sport 2.2 SD4,  and 
 2011–2014 Land Rover Freelander 2 2.2 eD4,  and 
 2006–2014 Land Rover Freelander 2 2.2 TD4,  and 
 2006–2014 Land Rover Freelander 2 2.2 SD4,  and 
 2011–2012 Jaguar XF  2.2 TDi4 , and 
 2012–2015 Jaguar XF  2.2 TDi4 , and 
 2006–2010 Citroën C5 2.2 HDi,  and 
 2006–2010 Citroën C6 2.2 HDi,  and 
 2006–2010 Citroën C8 2.2 HDi,  and 
 2006–2012 Citroën C-Crosser 2.2 HDi,  and 
 2006–2010 Fiat Ulysse 2.2 D Multijet,  and 
 2007–2010 Peugeot 407 2.2 HDi,  and 
 2007–2010 Peugeot 607 2.2 HDi,  and 
 2007–2010 Peugeot 807 2.2 HDi,  and 
 2007–2012 Peugeot 4007 2.2 HDi,  and 
 2007-2012 Mitsubishi Outlander 2.2 HDi,  and

V6

AJD-V6/DT17

The  V6 is built by Ford and Jaguar Cars at their Dagenham facility, and was designed by Ford engineers at their Dunton and Whitley product development centres. It is called AJD-V6 by Jaguar and DT17 by PSA Peugeot Citroën.

Ford and PSA extended their Diesel engine joint-venture in October, 1999, to include this V6 engine.

Applications:
 2006–present Citroën C6 2.7 V6 HDi,  and 
 2008–present Citroën C5 2.7 V6 HDi,  and 
 2004–2008 Jaguar S-Type 2.7 DV6,  and 
 2005–present Jaguar XJ TDVi 2.7,  and 
 2008–present Jaguar XF 2.7D,  and 
 2005–present Land Rover Discovery Tdv6,  and 
 2006–present Land Rover Range Rover Sport Tdv6,  and 
 2005–present Peugeot 407 Coupé 2.7 V6 HDi,  and 
 2004–2010 Peugeot 407 Touring 2.7 V6 HDi,  and 
 2005–2011 Peugeot 607 2.7 V6 HDi,  and 
 2011–2016 Ford Territory 2.7 V6 TCDi,  and

V8

AJD-V8

The 3.6 L V8 is built at Ford's engine plant in Dagenham, Essex. Production began in April 2006. It is closely related to the 2.7L V6 version (same bore & stroke) and was designed at Ford Otosan's R&D Center in Gebze, Turkey and Ford's Dagenham Diesel Centre product development site, with input from Land Rover powertrain team.

Applications (4.4 L variant):
 2010–2020 Land Rover Range Rover
 2013–2020 Land Rover Range Rover Sport

See also
 List of Ford engines
 British Rail Class 230

References

Duratorq
Diesel engines by model